Peter Klimentjevich Engelmeyer (10 April 1855 – 7 July 1942) was a Russian engineer and proponent of technology and positivism.

Engelmeyer was of German origin.

Engelmeyer was in correspondence with the Austrian physicist and philosopher of science Ernst Mach. He informed Mach of his growing influence in Russia, affecting such scientists as Nikolay Yegorovich Zhukovsky.

Engelmeier regarded all human activity as falling into three major categories: scientific, artistic and technical.

Publications
 1898 Tekhnicheskij itog XIX veka. (Technical sum of the XIX century) Moscow: Tipografija
 1910  Teorija tvorchestva (Theory of creativity) St. Petersburg: Obrazovanije
 1911 Tvorcheskaya lichnost’ i sreda v oblasti tekhnicheskikh izobretenij (Creative individual and context in the sphere of technical innovation) St. Petersburg: Obrazovanije
 1912 Filosofija tekhniki. Vypusk 2. Sovremennaja filosofija (Philosophy of technology. Ed. 2. Contemporary philosophy)
 1912  Filosofija tekhniki Vypusk 3. (Philosophy of technology. Ed. 3) Moscow: Nasha
 1913 Filosofija tekhniki. Vypusk 4. Technizism (Philosophy of technology, Ed. 4. Technicism)
 1915 "V zasshitu obssikh idej v tekhnike" (Defending the general ideas of technology) in Vestnik inzhenerov Vol 1. No. 3 February Moscow
 1925  Kak nado i kak ne nado izeobretat’ Konspect lekzij s diapositivami. (How we should and should not invent: Lecture notes) Moscow: Izdatel’stvo
 1929 Nuzhna li nam filosofija tekhniki? (Do we need philosophy of technology?) in Inzhenernyj trud'', Vol. 2, No. 15 January, Moscow

References

1855 births
1942 deaths
Russian philosophers
Engineers from the Russian Empire